James Thomas Welch (July 3, 1866  – November 7, 1901), nicknamed "Tub", was a catcher and first baseman for Major League Baseball in the 19th century. Welch was 23 years old when he broke into the big leagues on June 12, 1890, with the Toledo Maumees.

Sources

1866 births
1901 deaths
Baseball players from Missouri
Major League Baseball catchers
Major League Baseball first basemen
Toledo Maumees players
Louisville Colonels players
19th-century baseball players
Leavenworth Soldiers players
Hastings Hustlers players
Buffalo Bisons (minor league) players
Dallas Hams players
Dallas Tigers players
Houston Mudcats players
Montgomery Colts players
St. Joseph Saints players
Savannah Modocs players
Kansas City Blues (baseball) players
Dallas Steers players